Josef "Pepi" Schneider (1901 – unknown) was an Austrian football midfielder and manager.

He played for Wiener AF, SC Bewegung XX, Brigittenauer AC, Austria Amateure, FC Ostmark Wien, Wiener AC, Hungária FC, New York Hakoah, Brooklyn Wanderers, Grasshoppers Zürich, Stade Rennais, Le Havre AC and Olympique Alès.

He coached Stade Rennais, Le Havre AC and Austria Wien.

References

External links
 
 
 

1901 births
Association football midfielders
Austrian footballers
Austria international footballers
MTK Budapest FC players
Brooklyn Hakoah players
Grasshopper Club Zürich players
Stade Rennais F.C. players
Le Havre AC players
Olympique Alès players
Ligue 1 players
Ligue 2 players
Austrian expatriate footballers
Expatriate footballers in France
Expatriate footballers in Switzerland
Expatriate soccer players in the United States
Austrian expatriate sportspeople in France
Austrian expatriate sportspeople in Switzerland
Austrian expatriate sportspeople in the United States
Austrian football managers
Stade Rennais F.C. managers
Le Havre AC managers
FK Austria Wien managers
Year of death missing